Jean-Luc Masbou (born in Figeac on 14 March 1963) is a French cartoonist.

Masbou studied at the École supérieure de l'image of Angoulême. He has published the series L'Ombre de l'échafaud, for which he wrote the scenario, and the series De cape et de crocs as a cartoonist.

Works 
 De cape et de crocs written by Alain Ayroles
 Tome 1 : Le secret du Janissaire
 Tome 2 : Pavillon noir !
 Tome 3 : L'archipel du danger
 Tome 4 : Le mystère de l'île étrange
 Tome 5 : Jean sans lune
 Tome 6 : Luna Incognita
 Tome 7 : Chasseurs de Chimères
 Tome 8 : Le Maître d'armes
 Tome 9 : Revers de fortune
 L'Ombre de l'échafaud (scenario by Jean-Luc Masbou, cartoons by David Cerqueira and Sophie Barou)
 Tome 1 : L'affaire Brignou
 Tome 2 : L'Affaire Dudanne
 Tome 3 : L'Affaire Valkoviak
 Empire Céleste (scenario by Jean-Luc Masbou, cartoons by Minh-Than Duong and Thierry Leprévost)
 Tome 1 : Dragon et tigre

Sources and references 
 De Cape et de Crocs

1963 births
Comic book editors
French cartoonists
French comics writers
Living people
French male writers